Chittering may refer to:

Chittering, Cambridgeshire, England
Chittering, Western Australia